Zhaowen may refer to:
Li Shou (300–343), formally Emperor Zhaowen of (Cheng) Han, emperor of the Chinese/Ba-Di state Cheng Han
Murong Xi (385–407), formally Emperor Zhaowen of (Later) Yan, emperor of the Xianbei state Later Yan
Xiao Zhaowen (480–494), emperor of the Southern Qi dynasty